Anthony Massingill is an American who was convicted in a Dallas, Texas court of a 1979 rape and robbery for which recent DNA test results support his claim of innocence.  He was jointly convicted in the case along with Cornelius Dupree who was on January 4, 2011, fully exonerated of the charges.  Massingill is represented by the Texas Wesleyan Innocence Project and is likely to be cleared at a later hearing.

Yet, unlike Dupree who was paroled in July 2010, Massingill was also charged with and convicted of another rape in 1980 for which he remains incarcerated. Massingill maintains his innocence of the second crime, in which DNA testing is currently underway.

See also

List of miscarriage of justice cases
Overturned convictions in the United States
List of wrongful convictions in the United States

References

External links
Houston Man To Be Declared Innocent After Serving 30 Years For a Dallas Rape and Robbery He Didn’t Commit at the Innocence Project

Living people
1959 births
Overturned convictions in the United States
People from Houston
Prisoners and detainees of Texas